Gaponenko or Haponenko is a Ukrainian surname. Notable people with the surname include:

 Inna Gaponenko (born 1976), Ukrainian chess player
 Marjana Gaponenko (born 1981), German writer

See also
 

Ukrainian-language surnames